Samuele Conti (born 14 September 1991) was  an Italian professional racing cyclist, who is suspended since 21 march 2020 from the sport.

In September 2016 Conti tested positive for GHRP-2. Conti was handed a three-years-and-seven-months ban for his doping positive, whilst  manager Angelo Citracca, has threatened to take Conti to court.

in June 2018 Conti was acquitted in the first instance trial by the criminal court of Lecco because the fact does not exist.

Major results
2009
5th Overall 3 Giorni Orobica
2015
 9th Overall Sibiu Cycling Tour

References

External links
 

1991 births
Living people
Italian male cyclists
Cyclists from the Province of Como